Fathi Al-Jabal (born February 25, 1963) is a Tunisian football manager who is the current manager of Libyan club Al-Ahli Tripoli. He was the manager of Al-Fateh in the Saudi Professional League from 2008 to 2014, leading the Al-Ahsa club to its first promotion to the Saudi Professional League in 2009. He subsequently clinching the title in 2013, along with the first ever Saudi Super Cup.

Managerial statistics

Honours

Manager
Al-Fateh SC
Saudi Professional League: 2012–13
Saudi Super Cup: 2013

Individual
 Saudi Professional League Manager of the Month: February 2019

References

1963 births
Living people
Tunisian football managers
Al-Hazm FC managers
Najran SC managers
Hajer Club managers
Al-Fateh SC managers
Al Shabab FC (Riyadh) managers
Al-Shahania Sports Club managers
Al-Ahli Saudi FC managers
CS Sfaxien managers
Maghreb de Fès managers
Kuwait SC managers
Expatriate football managers in Kuwait
Tunisian expatriate sportspeople in Kuwait
Tunisian expatriate football managers
Expatriate football managers in Saudi Arabia
Tunisian expatriate sportspeople in Saudi Arabia
Expatriate football managers in the United Arab Emirates
Tunisian expatriate sportspeople in the United Arab Emirates
Expatriate football managers in Qatar
Tunisian expatriate sportspeople in Qatar
Expatriate football managers in Morocco
Tunisian expatriate sportspeople in Morocco
Saudi First Division League managers
Saudi Professional League managers
Tunisian Ligue Professionnelle 1 managers
Botola managers